Kathai is a village and union council (an administrative subdivision) of Mansehra District in Khyber Pakhtunkhwa province of Pakistan. It lies in an area affected by the 2005 Kashmir earthquake.

References 

  

Union councils of Mansehra District
Populated places in Mansehra District